Åsunden or Asunden may refer to:

 Åsunden (Västergötland), a lake in Västergötland, Sweden
 Åsunden (Östergötland), a lake in Östergötland, Sweden
 Asunden, Gotland, an island in Slite archipelago, Sweden